Andre Terrell Jackson (born May 1, 1996) is an American professional baseball pitcher for the Los Angeles Dodgers of Major League Baseball (MLB)

Amateur career
Jackson was selected by the Texas Rangers in the 32nd round of the 2014 Major League Baseball draft out of Cienega High School in Vail, Arizona, but did not sign and chose instead to attend college at the University of Utah. In 2015, Jackson's freshman year, he played as an outfielder, and hit .179 over 44 games. As a sophomore in 2016, he batted .299 with twenty RBIs over 34 games alongside pitching to a 6.41 ERA over 11 relief appearances. After the season, he underwent Tommy John surgery, and missed the 2017 season. Despite this, he was still selected by the Los Angeles Dodgers in the 12th round of the 2017 Major League Baseball draft as a pitcher.

Los Angeles Dodgers
Jackson signed with the Dodgers and made his professional debut in 2018, splitting time between the Rookie-league Arizona League Dodgers and the Great Lakes Loons of the Class A Midwest League, going a combined 3–5 with a 4.10 ERA over 18 games (17 starts), striking out 76 batters over 68 innings. He returned to Great Lakes in 2019 before being promoted to the Rancho Cucamonga Quakes of the Class A-Advanced California League. Over 25 starts between the two clubs, he went 7–2 with a 3.06 ERA. He did not play a game in 2020 due to the cancellation of the minor league season.

The Dodgers added Jackson to their 40-man roster after the 2020 season. To begin the 2021 season, he was assigned to the Tulsa Drillers of the Double-A Central. In June, Jackson was selected to play in the All-Star Futures Game at Coors Field. After pitching to a 3–2 record with a 3.27 ERA over 15 games (13 starts) and  innings with Tulsa, he was promoted to the Oklahoma City Dodgers of the Triple-A West in late July. Jackson was called up to the majors for the first time on August 16, 2021, and made his MLB debut that same night against the Pittsburgh Pirates. He pitched four scoreless innings in relief with five strikeouts, two hits, and four walks allowed. His first MLB strikeout was of Rodolfo Castro. He appeared in three total games for the Dodgers, pitching  innings while allowing three runs on ten hits for a 2.31 ERA.

In 2022, Jackson again spent most of the season in AAA, where he pitched in 21 games (19 starts) and had a 2–7 record and 5.00 ERA. He pitched in four games for the major league club, working  innings out of the bullpen and allowed two earned runs.

References

External links

1996 births
Living people
Baseball players from Arizona
Major League Baseball pitchers
Los Angeles Dodgers players
Utah Utes baseball players
Great Lakes Loons players
Arizona League Dodgers players
Rancho Cucamonga Quakes players
Tulsa Drillers players
Oklahoma City Dodgers players